Bekir Bozdağ (born 1 April 1965) is a Turkish lawyer and politician of Kurdish origin and current Minister of Justice. On 6 July 2011 he was appointed as the Deputy Prime Minister in the third cabinet of Prime Minister Recep Tayyip Erdoğan. On 26 December 2013, he was appointed as the Minister of Justice after the cabinet revision amidst the 2013 corruption scandal. On 19 July, he became Deputy Prime Minister again in the Cabinet of Yıldırım II.

He was born on 1 April 1965 in Akdağmadeni in Yozgat Province, Turkey. After completing his higher education in Islamic theology at the Uludağ University in Bursa, he gained a master's degree in Christian history of theology at the same university. Later, Bekir Bozdağ attended Selçuk University in Konya and graduated with a law degree. Before he entered politics, he worked as a lawyer.

He has been elected to parliament four times, in 2002, 2007, 2011 and 2015.

He is married and has three children.

References

External links
https://twitter.com/bybekirbozdag

Living people
1965 births
People from Akdağmadeni
Bursa Uludağ University alumni
Selçuk University alumni
Turkish theologians
20th-century Turkish lawyers
Turkish Kurdish politicians
Deputies of Yozgat
Justice and Development Party (Turkey) politicians
Deputy Prime Ministers of Turkey
Ministers of Justice of Turkey
Members of the 26th Parliament of Turkey
Members of the 24th Parliament of Turkey
Members of the 23rd Parliament of Turkey
Members of the 22nd Parliament of Turkey
Members of the 64th government of Turkey
Members of the 65th government of Turkey
Members of the 66th government of Turkey